Peter Fricke (born 26 August 1939, in Berlin, Germany) is a German television actor.

Filmography (incomplete)
 Die rote Kapelle (1972, TV miniseries)
 Alexander Zwo (1972, TV miniseries)
  (1973)
 Das Blaue Palais (1974-1976, TV miniseries)
 Derrick - Season 5, Episode 6: "Klavierkonzert" (1978)
 Derrick - Season 6, Episode 11: "Die Versuchung" (1979)
 Derrick - Season 7, Episode 2: "Unstillbarer Hunger" (1980)
 Der Sonne entgegen (1985, TV series)
 Der Schatz im Niemandsland (1987, TV miniseries)
 Derrick - Season 18, Episode 7: "Der Tote spielt fast keine Rolle" (1991)
 Derrick - Season 19, Episode 7: "Eine eiskalte Nummer" (1992)
 Derrick - Season 19, Episode 11: "Ein merkwürdiger Privatdetektiv" (1992)
 Derrick - Season 20, Episode 3: "Langsamer Walzer" (1993)
 Derrick - Season 22, Episode 2: "Anruf aus Wien" (1995)

External links
 
  
 Veronika Ebisch International Agency 

1939 births
Living people
Male actors from Berlin
German male television actors
German male voice actors
20th-century German male actors
21st-century German male actors